Kığı Dam is a rock-fill embankment dam on the Peri River (a tributary of the Euphrates) in Bingöl Province, Turkey. Its primary purpose is hydroelectric power generation and is the first dam in the Peri River cascade, serving as the headwaters. Construction began in 1998 and is backed by the Turkish State Hydraulic Works. When commissioned, it will support a 180 MW power station. In August 2015, suspected Kurdistan Workers' Party militants set fire to three cement trucks associated with the dam construction site. In January 2016, the dam was completed and the reservoir began to impound water.

See also

Yedisu Dam - located downstream
List of dams and reservoirs in Turkey

References

Dams in Bingöl Province
Hydroelectric power stations in Turkey
Dams completed in 2016
Dams in the Euphrates River basin
Rock-filled dams
Dams on the Peri River